Statistics of Belgian First Division in the 1903–04 season.

Overview

It was contested by 12 teams, and Union Saint-Gilloise won the championship.

League standings

Championship Cup A

Championship Cup B

Final round

See also
1903–04 in Belgian football

References

1903
Belgian First Division, 1913-14
1903–04 in Belgian football